Kasarsai is in Mulshi taluka of Pune District in the state of Maharashtra, India.Talukas surrounding Kasarsai are Karjat taluka, Talegaon Dabhade Taluka, Mawal taluka and by Khalapur taluka. Districts closest to the kasarsai are Raigad district, Thane district, Mumbai City district and Mumbai Suburban district. Nearest railway stations around kasarsai are  Vadgaon railway station, Begdewadi railway station, Lonavala railway station, Talegaon railway station and Kamshet railway station.

References

External links
 Area in Mulshi taluka 
  Villages in pune maharashtra

Geography of Pune district